Sharon Louise Carr (born 1981), also known as "The Devil's Daughter", is a British woman who is Britain's youngest female murderer. In June 1992, aged only 12, she murdered 18-year-old Katie Rackliff after picking her out at random as she walked home from a nightclub in Camberley. The murder initially went unsolved until June 1994, when Carr attacked and stabbed another pupil at Collingwood College Comprehensive School for no apparent reason, and then repeatedly boasted about the murder of Rackliff to friends and family and in her diary entries made in prison. She was convicted of the murder in 1997, attracting much media interest due to her young age and the brutality of the killing. She was ordered to serve at least 14 years imprisonment but remains imprisoned long after this minimum tariff expired due to her disruptive behaviour in prison. A Restricted Status prisoner, she has continued to regularly attack and attempt to kill staff members and fellow inmates and has regularly expressed her desire to kill others.

Carr's case has been noted for being particularly unusual. Whilst female murderers are themselves uncommon, females who kill strangers are even less so, and the case of a 12-year-old girl killing an adult stranger has been described as unique.

Background
Carr was born in Belize in 1981, and was brought up by her mother and stepfather. She was one of four children by three fathers, and grew up in great poverty. She never knew her biological father. After moving to England in 1986, the family settled in Camberley, Surrey. Her parents' marriage ended shortly after this when there was a serious domestic violence incident in which Sharon's mother poured boiling fat over her partner. The incident caused the couple to be hospitalised with burns and Sharon's mother charged with assault.

At school, Sharon was initially described as polite and helpful by teachers. Friends said that she was a sociable girl who preferred the company of older boys, and also said that she occasionally showed flashes of aggression. Later, she became much more badly behaved, becoming disruptive and attention-seeking, and she had problems relating to authority. In 1990, her headteacher at Cordwallis Junior School in Camberley contacted social services over her behaviour. Sharon was briefly put into foster care, but she returned home after only one month away. By the time she started secondary school, her mother had a new partner, who already had two daughters.

Murder of Katie Rackliff
On 7 June 1992, Carr randomly stabbed 18-year-old apprentice hairdresser Katie Rackliff to death as she walked home in the early hours from Ragamuffins nightclub in Camberley. In total, Carr stabbed Rackliff, who was a stranger to her, 32 times with a 6 and a half inch knife through her ribs, in her heart and in her vagina and anus. Some of her jewellery was then stolen. Following the attack, Rackliff's body was taken by Carr and some associates and driven to Farnborough, where she was dragged along a road and then dumped by a cemetery wall. The body was found later that morning by a group of boys.

When police investigated the killing, they noted the brutality of the attack. Some of the knife blows that Rackliff had suffered had gone straight through her body. Her sexual organs had been mutilated, and officers found that her clothes had been pulled up, but there was no sign of sexual assault. Due to the nature and severity of the injuries inflicted, and the fact that the attack appeared to be sexually motivated, police believed the attacker to be a fully grown male. In part because of this, the real killer went unidentified and the case went initially unsolved.

Stabbing of pupil
With Carr not apprehended, she returned to school, but was excluded twice in early 1994. Two years to the day after Rackliff's murder, on 7 June 1994, Carr attacked 13-year-old fellow pupil Ann-Marie Clifford with a knife for no apparent reason in the toilets at Collingwood College Comprehensive School, Surrey. Clifford was stabbed in the back, which punctured her lung, and she nearly died as a result of her injuries. The attack was only stopped when five students entered the toilets and intervened, which probably saved the victim's life. Clifford said that Carr was smiling and appeared happy during the attack on her.

Carr was quickly arrested and told officers that she enjoyed stabbing cats and had beheaded a dog.

Initial imprisonment and further attacks
After arrest, Carr was sent to a medical assessment centre, where she tried to strangle two members of staff. She was charged with two counts of actual bodily harm for this in addition to the charges for her attack on Clifford. She was convicted in December 1994 and sentenced to be detained at Her Majesty's pleasure. She was initially held in various psychiatric units but continued to regularly seriously assault other females, and so was transferred to an all-boys unit at Aycliffe Secure Centre. In September 1995, she was transferred to Bullwood Hall young offenders' institution, where it was thought her aggressive and sexualised behaviour could be better managed.

Confessions to Rackliff murder
Soon after her transfer to Bullwood Hall, staff discovered that Carr was talking about the killing of Katie Rackliff to friends and family on the telephone and in her diary. She also admitted to attacking a prison officer who she said she had a 'crush' on, and talked about it to a probation officer. Staff alerted police and they seized her writings and drawings. Her diaries were found to contain detail of her sexual excitement at the thought of Rackliff's death, and she also commented that she felt "jealous" of her victim and remarked about the devil and the forces which motivated her. One passage read "'If only I could kill you again. I promise I would make you suffer more this time, you fucking slag. Your terrified screams turned me on." The sexual element of the killing had previously been indicated by the mutilation on Rackliff's body. Carr had also written "I swear I was born to be a murderer", and in a letter to a friend wrote "I'm a killer. Killing is my business. And business is good." She had also drawn pictures of the knife involved. Detectives questioned her on the murder and she confessed to the killing, admitting that she had repeatedly stabbed Rackliff. She graphically described one particular injury and provided details of which the police had deliberately withheld, meaning that she had knowledge that only the killer would have. She also knew that a bracelet had been stolen from Rackliff, which police had not revealed. Carr helped police film a reconstruction of the murder in which she acted out the murder, and when questioned about the attack repeatedly laughed about the details.

Police found that Carr had a long history of cruelty to animals, having once decapitated a dog with a spade, and concluded that she was probably suffering from a form of psychopathic disorder. Carr continued to write her boasts about the murder even after being questioned by the police, and in January 1996 gave a further series of confessions to prison officers that she had a 'crush' on. On the four-year anniversary of the murder on 7 June 1996, she wrote in her diary: "Respect to Katie Rackliff. Four years ago today."

Murder trial
Carr was charged with the murder of Rackliff in May 1996. On 25 March 1997, after a month-long trial at Winchester Crown Court, Carr was convicted of murder. The jury had deliberated for five hours before reaching a unanimous guilty verdict, choosing to convict her for murder and not manslaughter. The conviction meant that Carr was officially Britain's youngest ever female murderer, having been only 12 at the time of the killing (Mary Bell was infamously convicted at age 11 of killing two boys in 1968, but she was convicted of manslaughter, not murder). When sentencing Carr, Judge Scott Baker remarked: "What is clear is that you had a sexual motive for this killing and it is apparent both from the brutal manner in which you mutilated her body and chilling entries in your diary, that killing, as you put it, turns you on. You are in my view an extremely dangerous young woman." Carr was smiling as she left the dock after the conviction. She received a minimum tariff of 14 years imprisonment after her trial.

Criminal psychologist Gordon Tressler noted the extremely unusual nature of the case, saying: "This is a difficult case to understand. One can find precedents of young children killing other young children, but in this case it was a child killing someone who was almost an adult."

Carr was branded 'The Devil's Daughter' in the press. The media reported extensively on the historical conviction of such a young murderer, highlighting her obsession with death and violence.

Subsequent imprisonment and continued attacks
Following her murder conviction, Carr was held in HM Prison Holloway, Britain's most notorious prison for women. She was later transferred to Broadmoor Hospital in 1998. Whilst in Broadmoor, she continued to assault staff and other residents, and admitted wanting to kill a fellow inmate by slitting her throat. On occasions, she also began believing that she was a lizard and tried to cut herself to attempt to find out whether she was still human.

In 2004, it was reported that Carr's defence team were challenging her 14-year minimum tariff as well as her conviction, with Carr wanting her murder conviction to be replaced with one of manslaughter on the grounds on diminished responsibility. However, the appeals were dismissed.

In 2007, Carr was moved again to the medium-secure Orchard Unit, but was sent to HM Prison Bronzefield in 2015 as a Restricted Status prisoner as she was presenting a risk to patients and staff. Her warrant stated that she no longer required treatment or that no effective treatment could be given. In December 2018, she was moved to HM Prison Low Newton, but was quickly moved back to Bronzefield after a violent incident with another inmate in August 2019. In the same year, her application for her Restricted Status to be downgraded was denied. She appealed against this decision in 2020, but this was also denied on the grounds that she had yet to provide any significant evidence in a reduction in risk. Category A prison supervisors at Bronzefield reported that Carr was still evidencing incidents of volatile relationships and was continuing to have paranoid thoughts. She had also disclosed the desire to murder another prisoner.

, Carr continues to be imprisoned despite the expiration of her minimum tariff.

Lasting notoriety
Carr's case has been noted for being particularly unusual. Whilst female murderers are themselves uncommon, females who kill strangers are even more unusual, and the case of a 12-year-old girl killing an adult stranger has been described as unique. Carr remains Britain's youngest female murderer.

In 2005, there was another stabbing incident at Collingwood College, in which a 14-year-old stabbed a fellow pupil. This led to renewed media interest in the school and the Carr case, with allegations being made that there was a culture of problems at Collingwood. However, local MP Michael Gove defended the school. In 2010, Carr's case was again discussed in the press when another British child, 15-year-old Lorraine Thorpe, became Britain's youngest convicted female double murderer. Her case also returned to the news in 2016, when two female children were convicted of the murder of a vulnerable woman named Angela Wrightson, which led to comparisons with Carr's case.

In popular culture
Carr's case has featured in a number of documentaries: 
In 2014, Carr was the subject of a season 8 episode of Deadly Women, titled "Never too Young".  The show incorrectly states her sentence as life without parole.
In 2017, Carr was the subject of an episode of Teens Who Kill, a series shown on Channel 5.
On 22 October 2017, a documentary on Carr made by television personality Jo Frost aired on Crime+ Investigation, as part of the series Jo Frost on Britain's Killer Kids.

See also
Mary Bell
Lorraine Thorpe – Britain's youngest female double murderer
Nicola Edgington
Murder of Alison Shaughnessy
Murders of Margaret Johnson and Ann Lee – still-unsolved stabbings of women close by in 1982
Murder of Jean Bradley – case that was once linked to Rackliff's murder

References

Notes

Further reading

External links
YouTube link to 2017 Jo Frost documentary on Carr
Prime Video link to 2017 Jo Frost documentary on Carr

1981 births
1994 in the United Kingdom
1992 murders in the United Kingdom
1994 crimes in the United Kingdom
1997 in the United Kingdom
20th-century English criminals
20th-century English LGBT people
21st-century English criminals
21st-century English LGBT people
Belizean emigrants to England
British female murderers
Camberley
Crime in Surrey
English female criminals
English people convicted of murder
English prisoners sentenced to life imprisonment
Incidents of violence against girls
June 1994 crimes
June 1994 events in the United Kingdom
LGBT Black British people
Living people
Murder committed by minors
People convicted of murder by England and Wales
People from Camberley
People with schizophrenia
Torture in England
Violence against women in the United Kingdom